The 2019–20 Los Angeles Kings season was the 53rd season (52nd season of play) for the National Hockey League franchise that was established on June 5, 1967.

The season was suspended by the league officials on March 12, 2020, after several other professional and collegiate sports organizations followed suit as a result of the ongoing COVID-19 pandemic. On May 26, the NHL regular season was officially declared over with the remaining games being cancelled. The Kings missed the playoffs for the second consecutive season. This is the first time since the 2008–09 season that the Kings missed the playoffs for consecutive years, despite the fact that the Kings went on a 10–2–1 run in their final 13 games and ended the season on a 7-game winning streak, as well as the fact that 24 teams made the playoffs due to the rest of the regular season being cancelled.

Standings

Divisional standings

Western Conference

Tiebreaking procedures
 Fewer number of games played (only used during regular season).
 Greater number of regulation wins (denoted by RW).
 Greater number of wins in regulation and overtime (excluding shootout wins; denoted by ROW).
 Greater number of total wins (including shootouts).
 Greater number of points earned in head-to-head play; if teams played an uneven number of head-to-head games, the result of the first game on the home ice of the team with the extra home game is discarded.
 Greater goal differential (difference between goals for and goals against).
 Greater number of goals scored (denoted by GF).

Schedule and results

Preseason
The preseason schedule was published on June 13, 2019.

Regular season
The regular season schedule was published on June 25, 2019.

Player statistics

Skaters

Goaltenders 

†Denotes player spent time with another team before joining the Kings. Stats reflect time with the Kings only.
‡Denotes player was traded mid-season. Stats reflect time with the Kings only.
Bold/italics denotes franchise record.

References

Los Angeles Kings seasons
Los Angeles Kings
Kings
Kings
Kings
Kings